The Phu My Hung Development Corporation (PMH) (Vietnamese: Công ty TNHH Phát triển Phú Mỹ Hưng) is a joint venture between the CT&D Group of Taiwan and City Government of Ho Chi Minh City.

PMH is a large urban infrastructure developer in Vietnam. Founded in 1993 by its founding chairman, Lawrence S. Ting, PMH is responsible for the planning of the 3,300 hectare Saigon South urban expansion plan that created the southward expansion option for Hồ Chí Minh City. The plan was the first Asian urban plan to win an American Institute of Architects Honor Award for Urban Design in 1997. 

PMH pioneered many real estate market practices in Vietnam and was among the first to introduce the concept of a condominium to Vietnam. Working with its banking partners, PMH was the first to offer long term mortgage loans. This helped the market to extend mortgage loans from previously 5-year term to 15-year term or longer. PMH was the first to fully develop a master planned urban development in Vietnam.

Awards
For its contributions, PMH has received many awards from the government of Vietnam, including: 
 Labor Medal of First Class from President Nguyễn Minh Triết (December 2007)
 First "Model City" award from Minister of Construction (June 2008) 
 Citation awarded by Minister of Education for contribution towards education (March 2011)
 Citations awarded by Hồ Chí Minh City (March 2008, February 2009. March 2009, April 2010 and March 2011)

In December 2007, Vietnamese State President awarded Lawrence S. Ting, the founding chairman of PMH, posthumously the Friendship Medal of Vietnam in memory of his contributions; this marked the first time the Friendship Medal of Vietnam was given to a foreign businessman. 

PMH's parent company CT&D Group was selected by the World Economic Forum (WEF) as a Global Growth Company in June 2011.

PMH also operates two schools: Saigon South International School and the Lawrence S. Ting Memorial School.

References

External links
Phú Mỹ Hưng Corporation

Real estate companies of Vietnam